A Boy and a Girl is a 1966 Soviet drama film directed by Yuliy Fayt.

Plot 
The boy meets the girl on the seashore and love arose between them. But soon the boy left, and the girl gave birth to a child.

Cast 

 Natalya Bogunova as girl
 Nikolay Burlyaev as boy
 Antonina Bendova as Tanya
 Tamara Konovalova as Nadya
 Pavel Kormunin as game director
 Valentina Chemberg as nurse
 Lyudmila Shagalova as woman in kimono
 Yelizaveta Uvarova as nurse in maternity home
 Larisa Burkova as waitress
 Nikolay Gubenko as passenger with guitar
 Pyotr Gorin as father
 Pavel Kashlakov as Petya
 Ivan Kuznetsov as colonel
 Vera Lipstok as mother
 Lyubov Malinovskaya as colonel's wife
 Inna Gulaya as girl (voice)
 Gennady Shpalikov as man with a samovar (uncredited)

References

External links 
 

1966 films
1960s Russian-language films
1960s teen drama films
Films set in Crimea
1966 drama films
Soviet teen drama films
Lenfilm films